The 1995 Asian Wrestling Championships were held in Manila, Philippines. The event took place from June 27 to July 3, 1995.

Medal table

Team ranking

Medal summary

Men's freestyle

Men's Greco-Roman

References
UWW Database

Asia
Wrestling
Asian Wrestling Championships
W